Courage is the twelfth English-language and twenty-seventh studio album by Canadian singer Celine Dion, released by Columbia Records on 15 November 2019. It is her first English album in six years after Loved Me Back to Life (2013). Dion worked on Courage with various writers and producers, including Sia, David Guetta, Greg Kurstin, Sam Smith, StarGate, Jimmy Napes, Lauv, LP, Jörgen Elofsson, Stephan Moccio, Eg White, Liz Rodrigues of The New Royales, and many more.

In June 2019, Dion ended her Las Vegas residency, Celine, and released "Flying on My Own" as a gift to her fans. In September 2019, she embarked on the Courage World Tour and premiered three more new songs: "Imperfections", "Lying Down" and "Courage". The album, which includes sixteen songs and four additional tracks on the deluxe edition, received generally favorable reviews from music critics. It debuted atop the US Billboard 200, becoming Dion's first number-one album there in 17 years. It also debuted at number one in Canada, Belgium and Switzerland. Courage charted inside the top ten in many other countries, including number two in the United Kingdom, France and Australia, number four in Germany, Austria and Croatia, and number five in Ireland, New Zealand and Portugal.

Background and development
In November 2013, Dion released her previous English-language studio album, Loved Me Back to Life. The next month, her husband René Angélil was diagnosed with throat cancer and underwent surgery. In June 2014, Angélil stepped down as Dion's manager to focus on his health and in August 2014 Dion postponed her show business activities, because of the worsening of her husband's health. Angélil died on 14 January 2016. On 22 May 2016, in her first public performance outside The Colosseum at Caesars Palace, Dion performed "The Show Must Go On" during the 2016 Billboard Music Awards, where she received the Billboard Icon Award. In August 2016, she released her French-language album, Encore un soir to critical and commercial success.

The next month, she premiered "Recovering", a song written by Pink in honor of Dion's late husband. The song was marketed as the first track off of her upcoming English record which, at the time, was projected for release in 2017. She performed it during the Stand Up to Cancer Live Event on 9 September 2016. In March 2017, Dion's "How Does a Moment Last Forever" was released on the Beauty and the Beast: Original Motion Picture Soundtrack. Dion also embarked on two summer tours in Canada and Europe in 2016 and 2017. In 2018, she released "Ashes" from the American superhero film Deadpool 2 and toured Asia, Australia and New Zealand. In September 2018, Dion announced the end of her Las Vegas residency Celine, with the final date set for 8 June 2019.

On 3 April 2019, she announced her 2019/2020 Courage World Tour, beginning in Quebec City, Canada on 18 September 2019. Dion also announced a new English-language album of the same name, to be released in November 2019. Explaining the name of the album, she said: "I think I went through a lot. And life had given me the tools… to find my inner strength, to find courage, and to keep going. The people that I love so much embraced the moments that were difficult. They gave me so much strength. And then a song came that was called "Courage", and it didn't take long for all of us to say, 'I think the album should be called Courage'". Dion announced the tour in a video titled "Ciao for now Las Vegas", in which she leaves Las Vegas in a car full of drag queens. Impersonator Steven Wayne stood in for Dion, alongside Bryan Watkins, Crystal Woods and Hot Chocolate as Barbra Streisand, Diana Ross and Tina Turner. The promo also teased the new song, "Flying on My Own". On 5 April 2019, on Jimmy Kimmel Live!, Dion promoted her upcoming tour, sang few lines from the song "Courage" and performed "Ashes". On 7 and 8 June 2019, Dion performed "Flying on My Own" during her Las Vegas residency show and the live performance was released to various streaming platforms on 8 June 2019.

Writing and recording
In April 2019, Dion revealed she had received 48 song contenders for the upcoming album and had to choose 12 of them. The new album, Courage, would explore new musical directions while also keeping the familiar style that Dion's fans are used to. After releasing Pink-written "Recovering" in September 2016, Dion recorded new music in October 2016 with Diane Warren, who wrote many of her hits, including "Because You Loved Me". In April 2017, Dion mentioned that Sia had written three songs for her. In April 2019, it was announced that the new album will include an appearance by Sia and that one of the songs written by her is titled "Baby". In December 2017, Dion revealed she has recorded new music with Stephan Moccio and Maty Noyes. Moccio wrote Dion's 2002 successful single "A New Day Has Come", and also co-wrote hits for other artists, including "Earned It" by The Weeknd and "Wrecking Ball" by Miley Cyrus. Also in December 2017, Dion recorded the song "Flying on My Own" at the Studio at the Palms in Las Vegas. The song was written by Jörgen Elofsson, Anton Mårtenson and Liz Rodrigues. In October 2018, David Guetta mentioned that Dion recorded a song he co-wrote with Sia. While announcing the Courage World Tour in April 2019, Dion revealed that she recorded a song called "Courage", which became the title track for the album, set for release in November 2019. The promotional video for the tour features a fragment of the new song, "Flying on My Own". On 20 May 2019, a fragment of another new song, "Lying Down", written by David Guetta and Sia was featured in Dion's episode of Carpool Karaoke with James Corden. "Flying on My Own" (Live from Las Vegas) was released as a digital download on 9 June 2019, the day after Dion ended her 16-year Las Vegas residency. The studio version was released on 28 June 2019. On 18 September 2019, Dion released three new songs, including "Lying Down", "Courage" and "Imperfections", shared the cover art for the album and announced the release date for 15 November 2019.

Critical reception

Courage received generally positive reviews from music critics. At Metacritic, which assigns a normalised rating out of 100 to reviews from mainstream critics, the album has an average score of 68 based on 9 reviews, indicating "generally favorable reviews". Mike Wass from Idolator rated Courage 4.5 out of 5 stars, describing it as Dion's most eclectic album, which is truly remarkable at this stage in her career. He felt that while the production of songs is inventive, the subject matter couldn't be more traditional, as Dion examines matters of the heart. Neil Z. Yeung of AllMusic rated the album 4 out of 5 stars calling Courage a transformative, cathartic release for the powerhouse vocalist that carries listeners through her process of healing and moving on. According to him, the album is buffered by a heavy dose of mid-tempo bloodletting that serves as therapeutic processing for Dion and as vulnerable confessionals to her fans. Nick Smith from MusicOMH also rated Courage 4 out of 5 stars. He pointed out that the themes of the album are coherent: inner strength, courage and self-reflection, and that Courage marks an impressive return.

Rolling Stone writer Brittany Spanos praised both the album's contemporary, upbeat dance-pop tracks, as well as the ballads, stating "across the LP, the dance-pop moments thrive best when there's a touch of campiness, which is where Dion's excellent performance skills shine", and "as with anything Dion does, the throaty ballads where she flexes her multi-octave mezzo-soprano are the true gems". In a summary, she compared Courage to Cher's 1998 album Believe, writing "consider Courage to be Dion's version of Cher's Believe: an album that arrived at exactly the right time and proved to a new generation that she's worth revisiting and recognizing as a diva very capable of keeping up with the times". According to Alexis Petridis from The Guardian, the best songs on Courage are ballads, which stick close to the music that made Dion famous, like the title track. Alexandra Pollard from The Independent wrote that the most affecting moments on the record seem to face the loss of a loved one, like in songs "For the Lover That I Lost" co-written by Sam Smith and "Courage". Michael Cragg of The Observer wrote that Courage, recorded in the aftermath of Dion's husband's death in 2016, is suffused with lyrics about loss and rebirth.

Jason Lipshutz from Billboard wrote that Dion's 2013's Loved Me Back to Life was a winning effort, but Courage is even more vital, with a "propulsive" opener in "Flying on My Own", a "devastating" title track, and many "worthwhile reflections in between". According to him, Dion's focus on Courage on loss, recovery and personal empowerment makes it one of the most mature and impressive pop releases of 2019. Courage was chosen as one of the best albums of 2019 by Billboard staff. In his review for Variety, writer A.D. Amorosi gave the album a mixed review, stating "the most glorious, and authentic, moments on Courage then, address bereavement, fear and finality in that pearl-clutching, gasping-for-air singing style that is Dion's, and Dion's alone". He criticized some songs on the album, such as "Flying on My Own", "Lovers Never Die", "The Chase", and others arguing that they make Dion sound "robotic and dull". He summed up his review writing "one could argue that Courage is the sound of Celine Dion unbound and unwound, ready to experiment beyond her usual theatrical soundscapes, and play in the fields with her tween chart contemporaries. That's fine. Get it out of your system now. At least half of the album is fantastic. But don't let her make a habit out of this". The Cavalier Daily wrote a positive review saying that Courage is Dion's best work to date and named "Falling in Love Again" and "How Did You Get Here" as the best tracks on the album.

Year-end rankings and accolades
Numerous publications listed Courage as one of the Best Pop Albums of 2019. AllMusic listed Courage as one of their 'Favorite Pop Albums' of 2019, calling it a "cathartic comeback". Billboard ranked Courage as the 50th best album of 2019, further saying: "Celine both digs deep, and lets us see her lighter side -- and that's the power of Dion". Idolator ranked Courage at No. 20 in their list of 'The Best Pop Albums of 2019' calling it her "best album since the 90s". Slate also listed Courage among the Best Albums of 2019.

Billboard also ranked four songs from the album in their list of Top 10 Fan-favourite songs of 2019, with "Imperfections" (No. 1) topping the list while "Courage" (No. 4), "Flying on My Own" (No. 6) and "Lying Down" (No. 9) also placed simultaneously on the list.

Accolades
The album received two Juno Award nominations at the Juno Awards of 2021, for Album of the Year and Adult Contemporary Album of the Year. Thanks to Courage, Dion was also nominated for Juno Award for Artist of the Year. The album won a Webby Award in the category Experimental & Innovation Social.

Singles
In June 2019, Dion released "Flying on My Own" as a gift to the fans. It reached number one in Quebec and top ten on the digital charts in Canada and France, and on the US Dance Club Songs chart. On 18 September 2019, Dion released three more songs, including "Imperfections", "Lying Down" and "Courage". The music video for "Imperfections" premiered on 26 September 2019 and the song was sent to radio on 30 September 2019. On 19 October 2019, "Lying Down" was added under the A-list on BBC Radio 2 airplay playlist in the United Kingdom and became record of the week. The music video for "Courage" premiered on 13 November 2019. "Soul" was sent to Italian radio on 24 January 2020 as the album's fourth promotional single and became available worldwide on various streaming platforms, before it was only available in Japan, as the albums japanese bonus track. "Change My Mind" was released as the album's third promotional single in the United Kingdom on 15 February 2020. It was added to the BBC Radio 2 B-List on the same day.

Commercial performance
Courage was a commercial success and broke several chart records all around the world. It became the best-selling album of 2019 in Canada and the seventh best-selling album by a female artist of 2020 in the United States, in terms of pure sales. According to IFPI, Courage has sold 600,000 units worldwide, becoming the 20th best-selling album of 2019.

Canada
Courage debuted atop the Canadian Albums Chart with 55,000 album-equivalent units, including 53,000 pure album sales, becoming Dion's 15th number-one album in the Nielsen SoundScan era and 16th overall in Canada. It achieved the highest one-week consumption total since Drake's Scorpion picked up 70,000 units in July 2018 and the highest one-week pure album sales since Taylor Swift's Reputation sold 80,000 copies in November 2017. It also achieved 2019's biggest single-week consumption total. Courage also debuted at number one in Quebec with 28,000 pure album sales. In the second week, the album dropped to number two in Canada, picking up the second-highest sales total for the week with 8,300 units. In the third week, Courage fell one position to number three but earned the highest album sales total for the week with 6,300 units sold. In Quebec, it stayed at number one for six non-consecutive weeks. Courage has sold 93,000 copies in 2019 in Canada. On the Canadian Nielsen SoundScan 2019 Year-end charts, it was the top-selling album (physical and digital sales). It was certified Platinum in Canada in January 2021.

United States
Courage also debuted at number one on the US Billboard 200 dated 30 November 2019, earning Dion her first US number-one album in 17 years, having last topped the chart with A New Day Has Come (2002). It is her fifth US number-one album, and earned 113,000 album-equivalent units, including 109,000 pure album sales. It also became her 13th top ten album on the Billboard 200. Thanks to Courage, Dion has collected number-one albums in each of the last three decades, being the fourth woman to achieve the feat after Janet Jackson, Barbra Streisand and Britney Spears. The next week, due to lack of streaming, Courage plummeted to number 111, setting a Billboard 200 record for the biggest second week drop for an album that debuted at number one and second biggest drop after Bon Jovi (1-169 for This House Is Not for Sale). On Billboards Top Current Albums, Courage fell from number one to position 13 in its second week and on the Top Album Sales chart it dropped from the top to number 21.

United Kingdom
In the United Kingdom, the album debuted at number two, selling 18,946 copies. Courage is Dion's highest-charting album since A New Day Has Come became her fifth number one in the UK in 2002. In the second week, it fell to number 13, selling 8,804 copies. On 27 December 2019, it was certified Silver in the UK. 

France
In France, Courage debuted at number two on the Overall Sales and Streaming Chart and number one on the Sales Chart with 24,000 pure album sales. In the second week, it fell to number seven on the Overall Chart and number five on the Sales Chart with 10,800 physical and digital copies sold. On 6 December 2019, Courage was certified Gold by SNEP. In 2019, the album has sold 77,000 copies there. In December 2022, it was certified Platinum for selling over 100,000 copies.

Other markets
Courage also debuted at number one in Belgium Wallonia and Switzerland (also in Romandy), number two in Australia and Scotland, number three in Belgium Flanders, number four in Germany, Austria and Croatia, number five in Ireland, New Zealand, Portugal and on the Finnish Physical Albums Chart (number 13 on the Overall Chart), number six in Poland, number ten in the Netherlands, Italy and South Africa, and outside the top ten in few other countries. In Japan, Courage debuted at number eight on the Western Oricon Albums Chart and number 49 on the Oricon Albums Chart. On the Billboard Japan charts, it entered the Top Albums Sales chart at number 41 and the Hot Albums chart at number 61.

Track listingNotes'
 signifies an additional producer
 signifies an orchestral session co-producer

Charts

Weekly charts

Year-end charts

Certifications and sales

Release history

See also
 List of Billboard 200 number-one albums of 2019
 List of number-one albums of 2019 (Belgium)
 List of number-one albums of 2019 (Canada)
 List of number-one hits of 2019 (Switzerland)

References

2019 albums
Celine Dion albums
Columbia Records albums